Cochylimorpha santolinana is a species of moth of the family Tortricidae. It is found in Spain.

The wingspan is 14–16 mm. Adults have been recorded on wing in March and April.

The larvae feed on Santolina rosmarinifolia. Larvae can be found from August to September.

References

Moths described in 1871
Cochylimorpha
Moths of Europe